The Non-Voters Party (NVP) was a socialist political party in Hungary, founded around the time of the 1878 election. At the founding meeting of the party, 79 delegates participated. The party sought to represent the non-enfranchised population, and advocated universal suffrage and democratic reforms. The party was led by Leó Frankel. In 1880 the party merged into the Hungarian General Labour Party.

References

Political parties in Austria-Hungary
Political parties established in 1878
Socialist parties in Hungary